Stillwater United Church, formerly known as Second Baptist Church, is a historic church at 135 Hudson Avenue in Stillwater, Saratoga County, New York.  It was designed by architect Marcus F. Cummings and built in 1873. It has a rectangular, gable roofed sanctuary above a raised basement of cut limestone blocks in an early Romanesque or Northern Italianate style. It features an engaged brick bell tower culminating in a belfry and topped by a tall spire.  A two-story brick education wing was added in 1952.

It was listed on the National Register of Historic Places in 2006.

References

External links
Stillwater United Church website

Baptist churches in New York (state)
Churches on the National Register of Historic Places in New York (state)
Italianate architecture in New York (state)
Churches completed in 1873
19th-century Baptist churches in the United States
Churches in Saratoga County, New York
National Register of Historic Places in Saratoga County, New York
Italianate church buildings in the United States